Two ships of the Royal Norwegian Navy have borne the name HNoMS Kvikk or Kvik (archaic spelling), after the Norwegian word for agile, deft, fast, jaunty, nimble, quick, quickly, rapid, sharp, slippery, vivacious:

  was a  launched in 1898.
  was a  launched in 1970 and sold for scrapping in 1995.

References

Royal Norwegian Navy ship names